The Tennessee Colleges of Applied Technology (TCAT) is a public college system operated by the Tennessee Board of Regents, with 27 campuses located throughout Tennessee.

Campuses
TCAT has 28 campuses and several branches from other campuses, including the following:

Athens
Brownsville
Chattanooga
Covington
Crossville
Crump
Dickson
Elizabethton
Fayetteville—Branch of Shelbyville Campus
Greeneville—Branch of Morristown Campus
Harriman
Hartsville-Trousdale
Hohenwald
Huntsville
Jacksboro
Jackson
Kingsport—Branch of Elizabethton Campus
Knoxville
Lewisburg—Branch of Shelbyville Campus
Livingston
McKenzie
McMinnville
Memphis
Morristown
Murfreesboro
Nashville
Newbern
Oneida—Branch of Huntsville Campus
Paris
Pulaski
Ripley
Surgoinsville—Branch of Morristown Campus
Tazewell—Branch of Morristown campus
Shelbyville
Whiteville
Winchester—Branch of Shelbyville Campus
Union City—Branch of Newbern Campus

See also
List of colleges and universities in Tennessee
Tennessee Board of Regents

References

Education in Tennessee
Universities and colleges accredited by the Council on Occupational Education